Song Sung Il (8 August 1969 – 29 January 1995) was a Korean Greco-Roman wrestler. He was born in Gwacheon, South Korea.

Born in Gwacheon, South Korea, he won a gold medal at 1994 Asian Games in Hiroshima. He also competed in 1992 Summer Olympics at Barcelona.

Death
He died of stomach cancer in Seoul on 29 January 1995, aged 25.

References

1969 births
1995 deaths
Olympic wrestlers of South Korea
Sportspeople from Gyeonggi Province
Wrestlers at the 1992 Summer Olympics
South Korean male sport wrestlers
Wrestlers at the 1994 Asian Games
Asian Games medalists in wrestling
Deaths from stomach cancer
Deaths from cancer in South Korea
Asian Games gold medalists for South Korea

Medalists at the 1994 Asian Games
Asian Wrestling Championships medalists
20th-century South Korean people